Shaheen Ashfaq (born 21 June 1949) is a Pakistani politician who was a Member of the Provincial Assembly of the Punjab, from 2008 to 2013 and again from May 2013 to May 2018.

Early life and education
She was born on 21 June 1949 in Gujranwala.

She earned the degree of Master of Arts in Political Science from the University of the Punjab in 1974.

Political career
She was elected to the National Assembly of Pakistan as a candidate of Pakistan Muslim League (N) on a seat reserved for women from Punjab in the 2008 Pakistani general election.

She was elected to the Provincial Assembly of the Punjab as a candidate of Pakistan Muslim League (N) on a reserved seat for women in 2013 Pakistani general election. In December 2013, she was appointed as Parliamentary Secretary for cooperative.

References

Women members of the Provincial Assembly of the Punjab
Pakistani MNAs 2008–2013
Living people
Punjab MPAs 2013–2018
1949 births
21st-century Pakistani women politicians